Christopher Allen (born August 12, 1998) is an American football outside linebacker for the Denver Broncos of the National Football League (NFL). He played college football at Alabama.

Early life and high school
Allen grew up in Baton Rouge, Louisiana and attended Southern University Laboratory School. As a senior, he was named the Class 1A Defensive MVP after recording 82 tackles with 14 tackles for loss and six sacks. Allen committed to play college football at Alabama after considering offers from Arkansas, Auburn, and LSU.

College career
Allen played in seven games as a freshman. Allen suffered a season ending injury in preseason training camp going into his sophomore year and was granted a medical redshirt. He returned the next year and played in all 13 of Alabama's games. Allen was named second-team All-Southeastern Conference (SEC) as a redshirt junior after recording 41 tackles with an SEC-leading 13 tackles for loss and six sacks. He suffered a broken foot in the season opener during his redshirt senior year and missed the remainder of the season.

Professional career
Allen signed with the Denver Broncos as an undrafted free agent on May 12, 2022. He was placed on injured reserve on August 10, 2022.

References

External links
Denver Broncos bio
Alabama Crimson Tide bio

Living people
Players of American football from Baton Rouge, Louisiana
American football linebackers
Alabama Crimson Tide football players
Denver Broncos players
1998 births